William Magee may refer to:

William Magee (archbishop of Dublin) (1766–1831), Anglican Archbishop of Dublin
William Magee (Medal of Honor), U.S. Army drummer and a Medal of Honor recipient for his role in the American Civil War
William Magee (politician) (1939–2020), American politician, member of the New York State Assembly, 1991–2018
William Connor Magee (1821–1891), Irish Anglican clergyman, Archbishop of York, 1891
William A. Magee (1873–1938), American politician, mayor of Pittsburgh, 1909–1914, and 1922–1926
William Kirkpatrick Magee (1868–1961), Irish man of letters who adopted the pen-name of "John Eglinton"
William Magee (physician), American plastic and craniofacial surgeon, founder of Operation Smile, 1982
Bill Magee (1875–?), American baseball pitcher for the 1898 Louisville Colonels

See also
William McGee (disambiguation)